Staatsolie, officially Staatsolie Maatschappij Suriname, is a Surinamese oil and gold company which was established to execute the oil policy which includes exploration, drilling and processing oil. In 2014 Staatsolie expanded its business to gold. Staatsolie is wholly state-owned.

History
In 1965 oil was discovered in Calcutta, Saramacca. On 13 December 1980, Staatsolie was established to manage Suriname's own oil industry instead of selling the oil fields to multi-nationals cooperations. On 25 November 1982, first drilling started in Tambaredjo. In 1988 the first crude oil was exported to Trinidad and Tobago. In February 1995 Staatsolie built a refinery.

In 2014 it was announced that Staatsolie would participate for 25% in a recently discovered gold field in the Merian area. In 2019 the production was 524,000 ounces of gold, resulting in an annual revenue of US$101 million.

On 27 April 2019, Staatsolie and Rosebel gold mine have come to an agreement for new mines. Staatsolie will participate for 30% in a joint venture with Rosebel.

References

External links
 staatsolie.com

Companies of Suriname
Oil companies
Gold mining companies